is an anime series produced by Sunrise that aired in Japan from March 15 to December 20, 1991 on Nippon Television with 37 episodes. The TV series was followed by four OVA titles that were produced from 1992 to 1998 with a total of 27 episodes. The opening and ending themes of the TV series are "I'll Come" and "Winners," performed by G-GRIP.

Episodes

Future GPX Cyber Formula (TV series)

Future GPX Cyber Formula 2 (OVA series)
Future GPX Cyber Formula 2 is divided into four parts titled 11 (Double One), Zero, Saga and Sin.

Future GPX Cyber Formula 11

Future GPX Cyber Formula ZERO

Future GPX Cyber Formula SAGA

Future GPX Cyber Formula SIN

Future GPX Cyber Formula: Early Days Renewal

1991 Japanese television seasons
Future GPX Cyber Formula
Lists of anime episodes